Arcam AB manufactures electron beam melting (EBM) systems for use in additive manufacturing, which create solid parts from metal powders. Arcam also produces metal powder through AP&C and medical implants through DiSanto Technologies.

Arcam AB was founded by innovator Ralf Larson and financier Jarl Assmundson, in 1997.

Arcam AB was a publicly traded company listed on the Stockholm Stock Exchange under ARCM but was also commonly quoted as OTC stock under AMAVF. Arcam AB corporate headquarters are in Mölndal, Sweden. EBM has applications in the medical, aerospace and automotive industries.

In September 2016, General Electric announced its plans for acquisition of Arcam AB.

References

External links
Arcam AB

3D printer companies
Manufacturing companies of Sweden
1997 establishments in Sweden
Companies established in 1997
Manufacturing companies based in Gothenburg
Companies listed on Nasdaq Stockholm